Ryan Dunlap (born October 21, 1983) is an American independent film and short story actor, writer, and director. He is often recognised for his feature film, Greyscale.

Life and career

Early life and career
Ryan Dunlap was born and raised in Tulsa, Oklahoma, where he studied film at the University of Tulsa.

According to Dunlap himself, he made his "directorial debut" at the age of four, having loved to fiddle with his parents' camcorder and filming his surrounding.

Film
After graduating from the University of Tulsa, he produced several short films such as Smugglin and Return to Volition before he wrote the film, Greyscale. His first feature film role was in Brian Shoop's Treasure Blind, playing the role of Alva Battlefield, one of three primary civil war thieves trying to steal a load of Confederate gold. After the role in Treasure Blind, he began to write Greyscale. Dunlap conceived the idea in May 2008, and shooting began in September 2008 and ended in April 2009. It was privately screened in Tulsa in late summer 2010. As of January 2011, he is based in Nashville, Tennessee. Dunlap was reported in January 2011 to have been creating a feature documentary for BrightBulb Entertainment.

He manages his own film production company, Daros Films, with his wife and two of his friends.

Writer
A member of the Tulsa NaNoWriMo group, Dunlap has written a book, entitled The Wind Merchant, to finance Greyscale. He reportedly wrote the book by hand, using a fountain pen and a leather-bound book. A sequel is in development.

In 2016, Dunlap entered JukePop and 1888 Center's Summer Writing Project 2016 and was selected the winner. His manuscript, The Goldfish was chosen for publication.

Select filmography

Film
Greyscale (2015; as Oliver Allen, also writer and director)

Select works

Literary
The Wind Merchant (2012)
The Littlest Clockwork (2014)
The Reclaimer (2014)
The Goldfish (2016)

References

External links
 

1983 births
American male film actors
American male television actors
University of Tulsa alumni
Living people
Male actors from Tulsa, Oklahoma